Textual variants in the Book of Deuteronomy concerns textual variants in the Hebrew Bible found in the Book of Deuteronomy.

Legend

List 

This list provides examples of known textual variants, and contains the following parameters: Hebrew texts written right to left, the Hebrew text romanised left to right, an approximate English translation, and which Hebrew manuscripts or critical editions of the Hebrew Bible this textual variant can be found in. Greek (Septuagint) and Latin (Vulgate) texts are written left to right, and not romanised. Sometimes additional translation or interpretation notes are added, with references to similar verses elsewhere, or in-depth articles on the topic in question.
 Deuteronomy 5 

Deuteronomy 5:6, see also I am the Lord thy God
  – WLC
  – LXX – LXX
  – Brenton ABP
  – Vg
 Compare Exodus 20:2.

Deuteronomy 5:7, see also Thou shalt have no other gods before me
  – WLC SP
  – 4QDeut (4QDeut)
  – LXX LXX Brenton ABP
  – Vg
 Compare Exodus 20:3.

Deuteronomy 5:11, see also Thou shalt not take the name of the Lord thy God in vain
  – ABP Brenton (classical Greek spelling)
  – LXX LXX (Koine Greek spelling)
 Compare Exodus 20:7.

Deuteronomy 5:11, see also Thou shalt not take the name of the Lord thy God in vain
  – WLC
  – LXX LXX. κᾰθᾰρός ("clean, pure") is the origin of the terms catharsis and Catharism.
  – Brenton
  – ABP
  – Vg. impunitus is the root of the term impunity.
 Compare Exodus 20:7.

Deuteronomy 5:14, see also Remember the sabbath day, to keep it holy
  – WLC
  – LXX LXX Brenton (no 'ὁ')  ABP
  – Vg
 Compare Exodus 20:10.

Deuteronomy 5:15, see also Remember the sabbath day, to keep it holy
  – WLC
  – LXX LXX Brenton ABP
  – Vg
 Compare Exodus 20:11 (an entirely different sentence in all witnesses, which supports Sabbath observance by reference to the Genesis creation narrative rather than the Exodus).

Deuteronomy 5:15, see also Remember the sabbath day, to keep it holy
  – LXX LXX Brenton ABP
 omitted – WLC Vg
 Compare Exodus 20:11:   .

Deuteronomy 5:16, see also Honour thy father and thy mother
  – WLC
  – LXX
  – LXX Brenton ABP
  – Vg
 Compare Exodus 20:12.

Deuteronomy 5:16, see also Honour thy father and thy mother
  – WLC
  – LXX LXX Brenton ABP (mentioned before καὶ ἵνα μακροχρόνιοι ἦτε / καὶ ἵνα μακροχρόνιοι ἦτε)
  – Vg
 Compare Exodus 20:12 (where this phrase is omitted in Hebrew and Latin witnesses, but identical in Greek witnesses).

Deuteronomy 5:17–19, see also Thou shalt not kill, Thou shalt not commit adultery and Thou shalt not steal
  – WLC
  – LXX LXX
  –  Brenton ABP
  – Vg
 Compare Exodus 20:13–15.

Deuteronomy 5:21, see also Thou shalt not covet
  – LXX LXX Brenton ABP
 omitted – WLC Vg
 Compare Exodus 20:17.

Deuteronomy 5:21, see also Thou shalt not covet
  – WLC
  – Brenton ABP
  – Vg
 omitted – LXX LXX
 Compare Exodus 20:17.

 Deuteronomy 22 
Deuteronomy 22:25
  – K
  – Q SP
  – LXX ABP Brenton

Deuteronomy 22:25
  – MT
  – ABP
  – LXX Brenton

Deuteronomy 22:26
  – WLC
  – ABP
 omitted – LXX Brenton

Deuteronomy 22:26
   – WLC
  – ABP
  – LXX Brenton

Deuteronomy 22:28, see also Rape in the Hebrew Bible § Deuteronomy 22:28–29
  – WLC
  – LXX ABP Brenton

Deuteronomy 22:28, see also Rape in the Hebrew Bible § Deuteronomy 22:28–29
  – WLC
  – ABP
  – LXX Brenton

Deuteronomy 22:28, see also Rape in the Hebrew Bible § Deuteronomy 22:28–29
  – WLC
  – LXX ABP Brenton

Deuteronomy 22:29, see also Rape in the Hebrew Bible § Deuteronomy 22:28–29
  – WLC
  – LXX ABP Brenton

Deuteronomy 22:29, see also Rape in the Hebrew Bible § Deuteronomy 22:28–29
  – WLC
  – LXX ABP Brenton

Deuteronomy 22:29, see also Rape in the Hebrew Bible § Deuteronomy 22:28–29
  – WLC
  – LXX ABP Brenton

Deuteronomy 22:30
  – ABP Brenton (classical Greek spelling)
  – LXX (Koine Greek spelling)
 Compare Songs 2:6.

Deuteronomy 22:30
  – ABP Brenton
  – LXX

 Deuteronomy 28 
Deuteronomy 28:30, see also Rape in the Hebrew Bible § Deuteronomy 28
  – Q
  – K
  – SP
  – LXX ABP Brenton

Deuteronomy 28:30, see also Rape in the Hebrew Bible § Deuteronomy 28
  – SP
 omitted – MT

See also 
 List of Hebrew Bible manuscripts

References

Bibliography 
 
 
 
 
  (E-book edition)
 
 Emanuel Tov, The Text-Critical Use of the Septuagint in Biblical Research (TCU), 1981 (1st edition), 1997 (2nd edition), 2015 (3rd edition).
 Emanuel Tov, Textual Criticism of the Hebrew Bible (TCHB), 1992 (1st edition), 2001 (2nd edition), 2012 (3rd edition).
 Emanuel Tov, Textual Criticism of the Hebrew Bible, Qumran, Septuagint: Collected Writings, Volume 3 (2015).

External links 
 Digitized Hebrew and Greek Manuscripts: Access and Issues – Introduction to online biblical textual studies

Biblical criticism
Early versions of the Bible
Book of Deuteronomy
Hebrew Bible versions and translations
Jewish manuscripts
Old Testament-related lists
Septuagint manuscripts
Textual criticism